The year 1679 in science and technology involved some significant events.

Botany
 Establishment of Hortus Botanicus (Amsterdam).

Mathematics
 Samuel Morland publishes The Doctrine of Interest, both Simple & Compound, probably the first tables produced with the aid of a calculating machine.

Medicine
 Great Plague of Vienna.
 Franciscus Sylvius' Opera Medica, published posthumously, recognizes scrofula and phthisis as forms of tuberculosis.

Technology
 Pierre-Paul Riquet excavates Malpas Tunnel on the Canal du Midi in Hérault, France, Europe's first navigable canal tunnel (165 m, concrete lined).

Publications
 Publication in Paris of the first of Edme Mariotte's Essays de physique: De la végétation des plantes, a pioneering discussion of plant physiology; and De la nature de l'air, a statement of Boyle's law.
 Publication by the Paris Observatory of the world's first national ephemeris almanac, the Connaissance des tems, compiled by Jean Picard.

Births
 January 2 - Pierre Fauchard, French physician (died 1761).
 January 24 – Christian Wolff, German philosopher, mathematician and scientist (died 1754)

Deaths
 January 14 – Jacques de Billy, French Jesuit mathematician (born 1602)

References

 
17th century in science
1670s in science